The elm cultivar Ulmus 'Sericea' was first listed by Lavallée   in Arboretum Segrezianum 236, 1877, as Ulmus campestris var. sericea, but without description. Deemed "possibly U. carpinifolia" (:minor) by Green

Description
Not available.

Cultivation
No specimens are known to survive.

References

Ulmus articles missing images
Ulmus
Missing elm cultivars